François Lake is an unincorporated settlement in the Nechako Country of the Central Interior of British Columbia.  It is located midway along the north shore of the lake of the same name, which is to the south of the town of Burns Lake

See also
List of communities in British Columbia

References

Settlements in British Columbia
Nechako Country